Associazione Calcio Bra is an Italian association football club, based in Bra, Piedmont. Bra currently plays in Serie D.

History

Foundation 
The club was founded in 1913 and spent several seasons in Serie C1 and Serie C2.

Serie D 
At the end of the 2011–12 season the team was promoted from Eccellenza Piedmont and Aosta Valley/B to Serie D.

At the end of the 2012–13 season the team was promoted from Serie D/A to Lega Pro Seconda Divisione

Players

Colors and badge 
The team's colors are yellow and red.

References

External links 
Official site

Football clubs in Piedmont and Aosta Valley
Association football clubs established in 1913
Serie C clubs
1913 establishments in Italy